{{DISPLAYTITLE:C16H14O5}}
The molecular formula C16H14O5 (molar mass : 286.27 g/mol, exact mass : 286.084124 u) may refer to:

 Brazilin, an indenochromene
 Coeloginanthrin, a phrenathrenoid found in the orchid Coelogyne cristata
 Guacetisal, a drug for respiratory disease
 Isosakuranetin, a flavanone
 Kushenin, a pterocarpan
 Lichexanthone, a xanthone
 Linderone
 Phyllodulcin, an isocoumarin
 Poriol, a flavanone
 Sakuranetin, a flavanone